Lawry's and Adolph's are food, seasoning, and beverage brands owned by McCormick & Company, and formerly owned by Unilever and Lawry's.  Products include marinades, spice blends, breadings, Spatini sauce, and other seasoning mixes.

References

External links 
 Lawry's website

Marinades
Herb and spice mixtures
McCormick & Company brands